The Russian State University of Justice is a university that trains the members and candidates of the judiciary (judges and court officials) of Russia. Until 2014, it was the Russian Academy of Justice, which was founded in 1998 after a decree from the president of the Russian Federation.

Branches 
It has eleven branches:
 Chelyabinsk: the Ural Branch ( / )
 Irkutsk: the East Siberian Branch ( / )
 Kazan: the Kazan Branch ( / )
 Khabarovsk: the Far Eastern Branch ( / )
 Krasnodar: the North Caucasian Branch ( / )
 Nizhny Novgorod: the Volga Branch ( / )
 Rostov-on-Don: the Rostov Branch ( / )
 Saint Petersburg: the Northwestern Branch ( / )
 inside Alexander Park, next to the Artillery Museum 
 Simferopol: the Crimean Branch ( / )
 Tomsk: the West Siberian Branch ( / )
 Voronezh: the Central Branch ( / )

References

External links
 

Law schools in Russia
Judiciary of Russia
1998 establishments in Russia